The Diocese of Viborg is a diocese within the Church of Denmark, covering the western part of central Jutland. Viborg Cathedral in the city of Viborg serves as the seat of the diocese's bishop. The diocese has the highest ratio of church members in Denmark, about 85%.

List of Bishops 
Jacob Schøning, 1537–1549
Kjeld Juel, 1549–1571
Peder Thøgersen, 1571–1595
Vacant (1595–1617)
Hans Iversen Wandal, 1617–1641
Vacant (1641–1661)
Peder Villadsen, 1661–1673
Søren Glud, 1673–1693
Henrik Gerner, 1693–1700
Bartholomæus Deichman, 1700–1713
Caspar Wildhagen, 1713–1720
Søren Lintrup, 1720–1725
Johannes Trellund, 1725–1735
Andreas Wøldike, 1735–1770
Christian Michael Rottbøll, 1770–1780
Peder Tetens, 1781–1805
Jens Bloch, 1805–1830 
Nicolaj Esmark Øllgaard, 1830–1854 
Otto Laub, 1854–1878
Jørgen Swane, 1878–1901
Alfred Sveistrup Poulsen, 1901–1921
Johannes Gøtzche, 1921–1936
Axel Malmstrøm, 1936–1951
Christian Baun, 1951–1968
Johannes W. Jacobsen, 1968–1985
Georg S. Geil, 1985–1996
Karsten Nissen, 1996–2014
Henrik Stubkjær, 2014–present

See also 
Ancient Diocese of Viborg
St. Peter's Priory, Grinderslev

References 

Church of Denmark dioceses
Diocese of Viborg